Tom Cato Visnes (born 27 November 1974), better known as King ov Hell or simply King, is a Norwegian musician. He is best known as the former bassist of black metal band Gorgoroth, but he is also the co-founder of Ov Hell, God Seed, Jotunspor, Audrey Horne, Sahg, I and Temple of the Black Moon.

Biography 
King joined Gorgoroth in 1999 just before the band's fifth album Incipit Satan was recorded. Although all the material for this album had already been written before King joined the band, he did write the music for five tracks on their next album, Twilight of the Idols (2003), and all of the music for Ad Majorem Sathanas Gloriam (2006), which was nominated for a 2006 Spellemann award in the 'Metal' category. King also reunited with former Gorgoroth drummer Kvitrafn to form a band, the “noisy black metal” project Jotunspor. Gleipnirs Smeder, their first album, was released in 2006 by the newly founded record label Satanas Rex. King was also the bassist for supergroup I, the side-project of Abbath Doom Occulta of Immortal which also featured members of Enslaved and Audrey Horne, as well as former Immortal drummer Armagedda. The band released the album Between Two Worlds in 2006.

King quit Gorgoroth in June 2006, due to having problems fronting some of the ideological aspects of Gorgoroth's agenda. He rejoined the band in 2007 in time for the recording of the music video for the track Carving a Giant, taken from the 2006 album. In September 2007, King filed a trademark application to the Norwegian Industrial Property Office for the name and logo of Gorgoroth, and the following month he and vocalist Gaahl attempted to fire founding member Infernus, igniting the Gorgoroth name dispute. In March 2009 the Oslo City District Court ruled that by doing this, Gaahl and King had instead excluded themselves from the band. Following the conclusion of this dispute, he and Gaahl assumed the name God Seed. Following the decision of Gaahl to retire from metal music in July 2009, King dissolved God Seed and formed Ov Hell with Shagrath, using the music he wrote in 2008 that was later intended to be used on the debut God Seed album for the debut album of his new band, with lyrics written by Shagrath.

In March 2008, it was announced that King would be playing session bass on the next Shining album, VI / Klagopsalmer. However, in October 2008 there was an announcement on the official Shining MySpace page saying that King did not take part on the new album after all, since a new permanent bassist had been recruited in time for the recording.

King has also worked in bands outside of the black metal genre. He used to be a member of Sahg, a doom metal influenced band. On their 2006 Regain Records release, Sahg 1, King played drums on one track. He was the bassist and composer for the Spellemann Award winning rock band Audrey Horne, billed as Tom. He left the band in 2007. King was also the bassist in the Norwegian drum and bass band Clububba. They were active during the early 2000s.

Ideology and relationships with the broader metal scene 
According to Gaahl - who was his contemporary for ten years spanning from 1999 to 2009 - he and King are friends with late Martin Eric Ain and Thomas Gabriel Fischer of the influential extreme metal band Celtic Frost.

King has also been closely associated with Shagrath, Dani Filth, and Rob Caggiano of Anthrax.

Since becoming more known to the broader black metal scene after joining Gorgoroth, he has also garnered numerous detractors.

Gorgoroth guitarist Tormentor departed from the band in 2002 due to no longer being able to cooperate with King.

Vocalist Pest clarified that he would probably not have liked to work with King when mentioning in a 2010 studio report by Sheol Magazine that he sometimes did wonder how it might feel to join the band again after having left in 1997.

Fenriz of Darkthrone has openly expressed disdain and hatred for King many times , mocking him and having held regard for him as one of the “ÜBERPOSERS […] constantly trying to destroy REAL metal”, and stated that he would not consider Darkthrone as black metal anymore “if what King ov Hell is doing is something anyone would call black metal. Let’s just say that we ditched the boat before all the dead meat sank it. Again. We play our own brand of heavy-metal speed punk now.” Fenriz in addition denounced King as exploiting Norwegian taxpayers' money by applying for "sick leave for months and months while touring and recording. That, my friend, is taking both MY money AND Norway's money." Darkthrone’s 2010 album Circle the Wagons was given the category number “ANTI-KING OV HELL 001”.

After having interviewed King for Black Metal: A Documentary, Bill Zebub expressed:

[T]here were some characters who bore façades, like King from Gorgoroth. Again, my intention was to be a silent observer, as a documentary film maker, and my hope was that people would be able to detect the character flaws. I regret that now, ha ha - it would have been interesting to see how tough that guy was after getting bitch-slapped. After the interview was done, King made all kinds of silly demands, but they were out of fear that footage of him smiling would be used. King claimed to be part of the black metal scene and to be friends with some of the old schoolers, but when I talked to the old schoolers they did not have nice things to say about King, and he most quite often referred as a "newcomer." Just smells like "poser" to me. You really have to give me credit for biting my tongue in that one.

Scrutiny and criticism over the legitimacy of King's claims to being a Satanist have been notably expressed by Blackmoon, who supported Gorgoroth founding member Infernus during the Gorgoroth name dispute. In an interview regarding his new band Ov Hell with Norwegian newspaper Bergensavisen in February 2010, which bore the headline The Church Is More Satanist Than We Are, King himself said he was not a Satanist despite having claimed to be so elsewhere both beforehand and afterwards, instead claiming that “[w]e take seriously what is dark in nature and the human mind”, and that “[t]he music, the images, the lyrics — all this is part of an artistic expression. Many find it provocative and scary, yes, but to us it is only parables.”
During a performance by Sahg at Garage, Bergen in September 2010, a member of the audience threw eggs at King, which was recounted with elation by Fenriz in an interview a few months later as the “Spinal Tap moment of the year”. Fenriz concluded “King ov Hell, apparently, IS Spinal Tap”.

Discography

References

External links 
 King on Myspace
 Jotunspor on Myspace

1974 births
Living people
Norwegian heavy metal bass guitarists
Norwegian male bass guitarists
Norwegian black metal musicians
Norwegian multi-instrumentalists
Norwegian rock bass guitarists
Place of birth missing (living people)
Gorgoroth members
Sahg members
21st-century Norwegian bass guitarists
Audrey Horne (band) members
Abbath (band) members
I (band) members
God Seed members